The SNCF Class CC 65000 diesel locomotives were built by Alsthom, CAFL and SACM between 1957–1958. They were most often used in the triangle Nantes-Tours, Tours-Bordeaux and Bordeaux-La Rochelle-Nantes.

65000
Alstom locomotives
Co′Co′ locomotives
CC 65000
Railway locomotives introduced in 1957
Standard gauge locomotives of France

Passenger locomotives 
Streamlined diesel locomotives
Co'Co' Diesel Locomotives of Europe